Amy Merania Harper (1900–1998) was a New Zealand photographer.  Harper was the first photographer in Auckland who used fluorescent lighting.

Biography
Amy Merania Harper was born on 23 May 1900 in Paeroa, New Zealand.  Harper began her career in photography when she was eighteen years old at the studio of H.J Schmidt in Queen St, Auckland. She worked as a retoucher and finisher. In 1922, her family purchased the Glenmore Studio in Eden Terrace where Harper became chief photographer. In 1928 the family practice expanded further with the purchase of Belwood Studios in Queen St which was later renamed to the Amy Harper Studios. In 1944 she purchased yet another studio on Karanghape road which she named Belwood Studios. She became widely known for her formal portraits which captured major life events for her customers. However, she was most well respected for her wedding photography which became a thriving business for her.

In 1945, Harper helped to establish the New Zealand Professional Photographers Association and was subsequently made a life member in 1975. Harper retired in 1979. She died on 15 September 1998 in Glenfield, New Zealand.

Legacy
Harper's collection of work has been exhibited at the Auckland War Memorial Museum in an exhibition titled Reflections; New Zealand Women's Lives Presented Through the Collections of Auckland Museum in 1993. It was also displayed for the public in 1992 at the Auckland City Art Gallery in the 1950s show.

References

External sources
 Works of Harper are in the collection of Auckland War Memorial Museum Tāmaki Paenga Hira
 Biography of Amy Merania Harper

1900 births
1998 deaths
New Zealand photographers
People from Paeroa
New Zealand women photographers
20th-century New Zealand women artists
20th-century women photographers
Photographers from Auckland